The Caselberg Trust is a charitable trust in New Zealand, named in honour of Anna and John Caselberg. It was established in 2006 to purchase the Caselberg's house in Broad Bay on the Otago Peninsula in the South Island of New Zealand. The house, which had been bequeathed to the Caselberg's by Charles Brasch, was renovated by the trust and opened to the public in 2008. The house also includes studio space, named the Charles Brasch Studio. The trust offers creative residences and runs the Caselberg International Poetry Prize.

The trust offers a number of residencies, including some in conjunction with partners:

 The Caselberg Trust Margaret Egan Cities of Literature Writers Residency is aimed at providing "international and Aotearoa New Zealand writers an opportunity to work on a substantial piece of creative writing and to foster connections among creative writers in Aotearoa New Zealand and internationally".
 The Elizabeth Brooke-Carr Emerging Writers Residency is a week-long residency, obtained through a recommendation from an established writer, and alternates between poetry, fiction, non-fiction, and journalism. 
 The CISS Scottish Writers Fellowship and CISS Irish Writers Fellowship take place in alternate years and are run in partnership with the University of Otago Centre for Irish and Scottish Studies.
 A summer residency for artists is run with the Blue Oyster Art Project Space.

Past residents 
Past residents include:

 Alison Isadora, 2023 Creative Connections Resident
 Sarah Hudson, 2022 Creative Connections Resident
 Lucy Marinkovich, 2021 Creative Connections Resident
 Megan Kitching, 2021 Elizabeth Brooke-Carr Emerging Writer Resident
 Turumeke Harrington, 2021 Blue Oyster Art Project Space Resident
 Catherine Macdonald, 2020 IN-PRINT Resident
 Bridget Reweti, 2019 Creative Connections Resident
 photographer Justin Spiers, 2018 Creative Connections Resident
 Victoria McIntosh, 2017 Creative Connections Resident
 Becky Cameron, 2016 Creative Connections Resident
 Alex Taylor, 2015 Creative Connections Resident
 Stanley Palmer, 2014 IN-PRINT Resident
 Pacific Underground, 2013 Creative Connections Residents
 Catherine Day, 2012 Down the Bay Resident
 Megan Jane Campbell, 2012 Creative Connections Resident
 Lynn Taylor, 2012 Down the Bay Resident
 poet Anna Smith, 2011 Writer in Residence
 Michael Harlow, inaugural resident

Caselberg International Poetry Prize 
The prize is awarded annually for a previously unpublished poem of up to 40 lines in length. The first prize is $500 and a week residency of the Caselberg house. Past winners include:

 2020: winner Tim Upperton, runner-up Giles Graham
 2017: winner Majella Cullinane and runner-up Ruth Arnison
 2015: winner Dunedin poet Sue Wootton, runner-up Jessica le Bas
 2011: winner Mary McCallum and runner-up Michelle Amas

References 

Artist residencies
New Zealand poetry awards
Dunedin